Cherry Orchard Bog Natural Area Preserve is a  Natural Area Preserve located in Sussex and Prince George counties, Virginia. The preserve is owned and maintained by the Virginia Department of Conservation and Recreation (DCR). It does not include improvements for public access, and visitors must make arrangements with a state-employed land steward prior to visiting. The preserve is located along the right of way for a power line, receiving acidic, low-nutrient groundwater.

Plants and preservation 
The site preserves a seepage wetland that supports a large collection of rare plants, including camass, bog-buttons, fringed orchids, and purple pitcher plants. This diverse community of plants has previously been maintained by frequent fires that prevented the long-term domination of woody plants. Since 2000, the DCR has managed the site with prescribed fire to expand and maintain the habitat for rare, fire-dependent plants. In 2014, the DCR began restoration work on the longleaf pines at the Cherry Orchard Bog preserve. Using a combination of tree removal, prescribed burning and planting, the DCR has managed to restore over 50 acres of industrial loblolly pine plantations to young longleaf pine communities.

See also
 List of Virginia Natural Area Preserves

References

External links
Virginia Department of Conservation and Recreation: Cherry Orchard Bog Natural Area Preserve

Virginia Natural Area Preserves
Protected areas of Sussex County, Virginia
Protected areas of Prince George County, Virginia
Landforms of Sussex County, Virginia
Wetlands of Virginia
Landforms of Prince George County, Virginia